Quinton is a village and civil parish in West Northamptonshire, England.

The village's name means 'Queen's farm/settlement'; or perhaps 'farm/settlement of Cwena' or 'woman's farm/settlement'.

Geography
The parish borders the parishes of Wootton, Hackleton, Hartwell, Ashton, Roade, Courteenhall and Grange Park. The latter housing estate, effectively all but an urban expansion of Northampton, is only 500 yards away across some fields.

Preston Green
Urban expansion of Northampton was being planned in October 2008 which would absorb the village in its entirety.

Demographics
The 2001 census shows a population of 194 people, 90 male, 104 female in 72 dwellings, increasing to 204 at the 2011 census.

Buildings
The Parish Church is dedicated to St John the Baptist, mostly remodelled in 1801, though the tower is 13th century and there are Norman parts. There is a notable monument to Eleanor Maccalum (d.1909) in the churchyard of terracotta with angels at the head and foot.

References

Villages in Northamptonshire
West Northamptonshire District
Civil parishes in Northamptonshire